The 1981–82 Tercera División season was the 5th season since establishment as the 4th tier.

League tables

Group I

Group II

Group III

Group IV

Group V

Group VI

Group VII

Group VIII

Group IX

Group X

Group XI

Group XII

Group XIII

Promotion playoff

First round

Final Round

Season records
 Most wins: 27, Güímar and Albacete.
 Most draws: 18, Atlético Riveira.
 Most losses: 28, Quart de Poblet and Toscal.
 Most goals for: 90, Real Valladolid Promesas.
 Most goals against: 116, Toscal.
 Most points: 62, Poblense.
 Fewest wins: 2, Quart de Poblet.
 Fewest draws: 2, Ciudad Rodrigo.
 Fewest losses: 2, Poblense.
 Fewest goals for: 19, Verín.
 Fewest goals against: 18, Poblense and Orihuela.
 Fewest points: 12, Quart de Poblet.

Notes

External links
www.rsssf.com
www.futbolme.com

Tercera División seasons
4
Spain